Harry Linn Fisher (19 January 1885 – 19 March 1961) was the 69th national president of the American Chemical Society, and an authority on the chemistry of vulcanization.  Fisher was the author of four popular books on the chemistry and technology of rubber, and the holder of 50 patents.

Personal

Fisher was born on Jan. 19, 1885, in Kingston, New York  His father was the engineer, who in 1883, took the first locomotive from Kingston, N. Y., to Weehawken, New Jersey, along the tracks of the old New York, West Shore and Buffalo Railroad.  In 1910, he married Nellie Edna Andrews.  They had a son and two daughters.  Fisher was said to enjoy "color photography, singing and mountain climbing".  Fisher died on 19 March 1961.

Education

After finishing High School, Fisher worked for three years before taking a year of refresher coursework at Dwight School in New York City.  He went on to study at Williams College in Williamstown, Mass.  He majored in classics, but switched to chemistry in his junior year, obtaining his AB degree in 1909.  Fisher then attended Columbia University on scholarship, earning his PhD degree in 1912 under Marston Taylor Bogert.  His PhD dissertation focused on the preparation and properties of 5-aminoquinoline-6-carboxylic acid and related compounds.

Career

 1912-1919 Instructor in Organic Chemistry at Columbia University
 1919-1926 B. F. Goodrich, Akron, Ohio
 1926-1936 Research Chemist at U. S. Rubber Company, New York and New Jersey
 1936-1950 Director of Organic Research at U. S. Industrial Chemicals
 1950 retired
 1951-1952 Administrative Assistant for the National Research Council, special assistant to the director of the Office of Synthetic Rubber
 1953 - Head, Department of Rubber Technology, University of Southern California

Recognitions
 Columbia University's Chandler Medal for his outstanding contributions to the chemistry of synthetic rubber 
 1949 Charles Goodyear Medal for outstanding achievement in the field of rubber chemistry

References

Presidents of the American Chemical Society
Polymer scientists and engineers
People from Kingston, New York
1885 births
1961 deaths
Williams College alumni
Presidents of the American Institute of Chemists